Results of Rally d'Italia Sardegna (4º Supermag Rally Italia Sardinia), 7th round of 2007 World Rally Championship, was run on May 18–20:



Results

Retirements 
  Daniel Carlsson - withdrew right after official rally start, before SS1;
  Gareth MacHale - stopped in stage (SS8);
  Mads Østberg - stopped in stage (SS8);
  Luís Pérez Companc - went off the road (SS8);
  Jan Kopecký - steering problems (SS12);
  Sébastien Loeb - went off the road (SS13);

Special Stages 
All dates and times are CEST (UTC+2).

Championship standings after the event

Drivers' championship

Manufacturers' championship

External links 
 Results on official site - WRC.com
 Results on eWRC-results.com
 Results on RallyBase.nl

Sardinia
2007
Rally